Ricardo Camacho (born 25 December 1955) is a Spanish diver. He competed at the 1976 Summer Olympics, the 1980 Summer Olympics and the 1984 Summer Olympics.

References

1955 births
Living people
Spanish male divers
Olympic divers of Spain
Divers at the 1976 Summer Olympics
Divers at the 1980 Summer Olympics
Divers at the 1984 Summer Olympics
Place of birth missing (living people)